Iván César Asenjo Góngora (born January 16, 1982) is a Chilean former footballer and football manager.

Playing career
He started his career in Deportes Puerto Montt, before moving to PSDS Deli Serdang in Indonesia in 2003. He played for several different poor clubs in Indonesia for four years before he was signed by Malaysian Premier League, second division side Johor Pasir Gudang in 2007. He also had a stint with Deportes Valdivia in 2004 in the Tercera División de Chile.

Managerial career
As a football coach, he has worked as assistant of Cristian Muñoz in Municipal La Pintana, later Deportes La Pintana and Deportes Pintana, as well as the head coach of the same team in the 2016–17 season. After he worked in the Deportes Valdivia youth system and was the assitant of Jürgen Press in 2019.

As a fitness coach, he worked for Deportes Valdivia in 2012.

In 2021, he assumed as Sport Director of Deportes Valdivia.

References

External links
 profile at allsoccerplayers.com
 Entrevista a Iván Asenjo Deportes Para ti on Facebook 

1982 births
Living people
People from Valdivia
Chilean footballers
Chilean expatriate footballers
Puerto Montt footballers
PSDS Deli Serdang players
PSMS Medan players
Deportes Valdivia footballers
PS Barito Putera players
Persim Maros players
Johor Darul Ta'zim II F.C. players
Hougang United FC players
Chilean Primera División players
Primera B de Chile players
Indonesian Premier Division players
Tercera División de Chile players
Malaysia Premier League players
Singapore Premier League players
Chilean expatriate sportspeople in Indonesia
Chilean expatriate sportspeople in Malaysia
Chilean expatriate sportspeople in Singapore
Expatriate footballers in Indonesia
Expatriate footballers in Malaysia
Expatriate footballers in Singapore
Association football forwards
Chilean football managers
Segunda División Profesional de Chile managers